David Earl Hutchison (born January 10, 1976) is an American football coach and former player.  He served as the head football coach at Glenville State College from 2011 to 2016, compiling a record of 34–32.

Coaching career
Hutchison graduated from Adrian College in 1999 and played at Adrian as wide receiver for three seasons. While finishing his degree at Adrian, Hutchison was a student assistant coaching wide receivers at Adrian in 1998. He then became a graduate assistant at Toledo from 1999 to 2000 and Missouri in 2001 all under Gary Pinkel. In 2002, he became running backs coach at Indiana State then became offensive line coach in 2003. For the 2005 and 2006 seasons, Hutchison was also recruiting coordinator at Indiana State.

After five seasons at Indiana State, Hutchison joined Lloyd Carr's final staff at Michigan in 2007 as offensive quality control coach. In 2008, Hutchison joined Glenville State College as offensive line coach and offensive coordinator. Glenville State finished in first place in the West Virginia Intercollegiate Athletic Conference in 2008. In 2010, Hutchison was promoted to assistant head coach. He became head coach in 2011.

Head coaching record

References

External links
 Glenville State profile

1976 births
Living people
Adrian Bulldogs football coaches
Adrian Bulldogs football players
Glenville State Pioneers football coaches
Indiana State Sycamores football coaches
Missouri Tigers football coaches
Toledo Rockets football players
University of Missouri alumni
University of Toledo alumni
People from Lenawee County, Michigan